The 2014–15 Notre Dame Fighting Irish men's ice hockey team represents the University of Notre Dame in the 2014–15 NCAA Division I men's ice hockey season. The team is coached by Jeff Jackson, in his 10th season with the Fighting Irish. The Fighting Irish play their home games at Compton Family Ice Arena on campus in Notre Dame, Indiana, competing in Hockey East.

Previous season
In 2013–14, the Fighting Irish finished 8th in Hockey East with a record of 23–13–2, 9–9–2 in conference play. In the 2014 Hockey East Men's Ice Hockey Tournament, they defeated top-seeded Boston College in the quarterfinal, two games to one, before falling to UMass Lowell in the semifinals, 0–4. They qualified for the 2014 NCAA Division I Men's Ice Hockey Tournament and were selected as the second seed in the West Region in St. Paul, Minnesota. They fell in overtime, 3–4, to St. Cloud State in the first round and were eliminated.

Personnel

Roster

As of January 8, 2015..

Coaching staff

Standings

Schedule

|-
!colspan=12 style=""| Exhibition

|-
!colspan=12 style=""| Regular Season

|-
!colspan=12 style=""| Postseason

Statistics
Updated as of March 17, 2015.

Rankings

References

Notre Dame Fighting Irish men's ice hockey seasons
Notre Dame Fighting Irish
Notre Dame Fighting Irish
Notre Dame Fighting Irish
Notre Dame Fighting Irish